The 1960 United States presidential election in New Jersey took place on November 8, 1960. All 50 states were part of the 1960 United States presidential election. Voters chose 16 electors to the Electoral College, which selected the president and vice president.

New Jersey was won by the Democratic nominees, Senator John F. Kennedy of Massachusetts and his running mate Senate Majority Leader Lyndon B. Johnson of Texas. Kennedy and Johnson defeated the Republican nominees, Vice President Richard Nixon of California and his running mate Ambassador Henry Cabot Lodge, Jr. of Massachusetts. 

Kennedy carried New Jersey with 49.96% of the vote to Nixon’s 49.16%, a margin of 0.80%. Kennedy managed to narrowly win the state despite winning only seven counties to Nixon’s 14. However, Kennedy managed to rack up large margins decisively winning some of the most heavily populated counties in the state, while keeping the results very close in those heavily populated counties that he lost. As the first Roman Catholic nominee, from an urban Irish immigrant background, John Kennedy appealed strongly to working-class Catholics and other urban ethnic immigrant groups, who turned out in record numbers to support him. Thus Kennedy's support base was condensed into mostly heavily populated urban areas. 

In urban Hudson County, home to Bayonne, Jersey City, and Hoboken, and part of the New York City area where Kennedy did very well, Kennedy won countywide by a decisive 60–39 margin. This represented a major shift from 1956, when Republican Dwight Eisenhower had won Hudson County by 20 points. In Mercer County, home to the state capital of Trenton, Kennedy received his largest share of the vote, winning 61–39. 

Essex County, home to Newark, had long been Republican-leaning, last voting Democratic in 1936. However Kennedy won the heavily populated county by a decisive 55–42 margin, the start of a re-alignment of the county; by the end of the 1960s, Essex County would be the most Democratic county in New Jersey. Kennedy also won heavily populated Middlesex County by a 58–41 margin. In equally heavily populated Union County, Nixon won, but only by a razor-thin 50–49 margin. In Passaic County, Kennedy won by a 51–45 margin. In Camden County, Kennedy won 55–45. 

Nixon was able to keep the race close statewide by winning several fairly populated suburban counties, like Monmouth County and Morris County, along with many rural counties; overall his biggest prize was heavily populated Bergen County, which went to Nixon by a 59–41 margin. Nixon's strongest county by vote share was rural Sussex County, where he received 69% of the vote to Kennedy's 31%. 

New Jersey in this era was usually a swing state with a slight Republican lean. But in 1960, excitement among the many Catholic and other ethnic immigrant communities that populated New Jersey’s cities for the historic candidacy of John F. Kennedy led to record turnout to elect the first Catholic president, thus narrowly delivering the state to Kennedy. The Great Migration also helped Kennedy, who clearly won the state’s African-American voters. As Kennedy eked out a razor-thin victory nationally to win the presidency, New Jersey voted basically how the nation voted. But under the unique circumstances that made Kennedy popular in Northeastern states, New Jersey's results in 1960 made it about .18% more Democratic than the national average. This was also the last election until fellow Democratic candidate from Massachusetts John Kerry did so in 2004, when a Northern Democrat won New Jersey, as the next three Democratic presidential candidates to carry the state were all from the South (Lyndon B. Johnson was from Texas, Bill Clinton from Arkansas, and Al Gore from Tennessee), even though New Jersey is a northern state. This was also the first time since 1904 that New Jersey voted more Democratic than the rest of the nation. This is the last time a Democrat won without Burlington, Gloucester, and Atlantic counties.

Primaries

Democratic primary

No candidates ran in the Democratic primary. Unpledged at-large delegates were elected.

Governor Robert B. Meyner wanted to lead an unpledged state delegation to the convention  to support him as a favorite son. Kennedy opted to allow him to do this, and therefore did not compete in New Jersey. Kennedy did so because he was confident that Meyner lacked national appeal, and thus, if convention voting went into multiple rounds, Kennedy would be able to secure the backing of New Jersey delegates after the first round.

Republican primary

No candidates ran in the Republican primary. Unpledged at-large delegates were elected.

General election

Results

Results by county

See also
 United States presidential elections in New Jersey
 Presidency of John F. Kennedy
 Presidency of Lyndon B. Johnson

References

New Jersey
1960
1960 New Jersey elections